Woodgate Crest is a crest rising to 2040 m, in the All-Blacks Nunataks, west of the Churchill Mountains. Named in honor of Paul Woodgate MNZM, Antarctica New Zealand employee from 1981–present, currently Movements Controller. Paul plays a key role for all travelers to the ice with New Zealand's program, handling cargo and passenger movements.

Nunataks of Oates Land